Frederik's Church is a church in Aarhus, Denmark. The church is situated in the southern Højbjerg neighbourhood on Hørhavevej. Frederik's Church is a parish church, and the only church in Skåde Parish, under the Diocese of Aarhus within the Church of Denmark, the Danish state church. The church serves some 11.000 parishioners in Skåde Parish and holds weekly sermons along with weddings, burials and baptisms.

Frederik's Church is the last Danish church which draws obvious inspiration from the medieval architectural tradition; in the years following the Second World War architecture generally diverged in many different directions. The architect was Harald Lønborg-Jensen who also designed  Åbyhøj Church. In the first years Frederik's Church was an annex church of Holme Parish and the first priest was also the priest of Holme Parish but Skåde Parish was created and got its own pastorate in 1949 when Holme Parish was divided. The church is named after crown prince Frederik, later king Frederick IX and the initials for the royal couple of the time is engraved in the front most benches.

Frederik's Church had an adjacent building for parish council meetings and communal work added in 1973. Growing population through the 1950s and 1960s resulted in the church itself being too small for the needs of the community so it was decided to add a building specifically for other activities. The building was named Frederiksgården to follow the tradition of the church.

Frederik's Church is a Green Church (Grøn Kirke). Green Churches is a network of Danish churches dedicated to implement and further an environmentally friendly operation and climate actions in relation to the current climate crisis. The network agenda was launched by the National Council of Churches in Denmark (NCCD) in 2011.

See also
 List of churches in Aarhus

References

External links
 
 
 

Lutheran churches in Aarhus
Churches in the Central Denmark Region
Churches completed in 1944
Churches in the Diocese of Aarhus